Ronnie Drew was an Irish folk musician who founded The Dubliners in 1962. As a solo artist he released twelve studio albums, one compilation album and four singles.

Albums

Compilation albums

Featured Albums

EPs

Singles

Music videos

See also
The Dubliners discography

References

Drew, Ronnie